The Great Wall Florid is a subcompact car produced by the Chinese manufacturer Great Wall Motors between 2008 and 2013. Styling is suspected to be copied from the first generation Toyota Ist (Scion xA), while the nose section is inspired by the second generation Toyota Vitz (Yaris hatchback) with the headlights being inspired by the Toyota Ractis.

It is sold in various countries including South Africa. There are two versions of Florid, the basic (Florid) and the Florid Cross which adds new design wheels, interior trim and a bodykit.

Trim levels
Great Wall Florid comes in two available trim models: luxury and elite. The Luxury package comes with a standard 1.3 inline four cylinder engine with variable valve timing and dual overhead cam shafts. The elite model comes with a slightly larger 1.5 inline four cylinder with that same technology. Great Wall Motors also only allows the consumer to one transmission option: 5 speed manual.

Great Wall Motors' webpage also proudly advertises its use of "A German Bosch 8.0 ABS + EBD System", "World Famous Autoliv Airbags", & "A Height Adjustable Headlight Feature" (which pans the focus of the headlight either up or down).

The Florid features surprisingly similar design details in the front resembling a Toyota Yaris and the rear heavily resembling a Toyota Ist/ North American Scion xA.

Gallery

References

External links

Official website (archived)

Florid
Hatchbacks
Subcompact cars
Cars introduced in 2009
2010s cars
Cars of China